The Home of Dark Butterflies is a 2008 Finnish film directed by Dome Karukoski and starring Niilo Syväoja, Tommi Korpela, Kristiina Halttu and Kati Outinen. The film is an adaptation of the award-winning novel of the same name by Leena Lander.

The Home of Dark Butterflies was released on 11 January 2008 and was well received in its native Finland, winning the 2009 Jussi Awards for Best Direction (Karukoski), Best Editing (Ylönen), Best Supporting Actor (Sveholm) and the People's Choice Award.

Cast
 Niilo Syväoja as Juhani Johansson 
 Tommi Korpela as Olavi Harjula 
 Kristiina Halttu as Irene Harjula 
 Kati Outinen as Tyyne 
 Pertti Sveholm as Erik Johansson 
 Matleena Kuusniemi as Maire Johansson 
 Eero Milonoff as Salmi 
 Marjut Maristo as Vanamo Harjula 
 Roope Karisto as Sjöblom 
 Ville Saksela as Rinne

See also
 2008 in film
 Cinema of Finland
 List of Finnish films: 2000s

References

External links
  
 

Films directed by Dome Karukoski
Finnish drama films
2000s Finnish-language films
2008 films
Films based on Finnish novels
Films scored by Panu Aaltio